Serena Harriet Scott Thomas (born 21 September 1961) is an English actress and documentary producer. Her television roles include Diana, Princess of Wales in Diana: Her True Story in 1993. Her film appearances include The World Is Not Enough (1999), Hostage (2005), Brothel (2008), and Inherent Vice (2014).

Early life
Scott Thomas was born in Nether Compton, Dorset. Her mother, Deborah (née Hurlbatt), was brought up in Hong Kong and Africa, and studied drama before marrying her father, Lieutenant Commander Simon Scott Thomas, a pilot in the Royal Navy who died in a flying accident in 1966.

Career
Scott Thomas is known for her portrayal of Diana, Princess of Wales, in the television mini-series Diana: Her True Story (1993), and for playing the lead in the TV film Harnessing Peacocks (1993) and Dr. Molly Warmflash in the James Bond film The World Is Not Enough (1999). She played a villainous "watcher" in the Buffy the Vampire Slayer episode "Revelations" (1998) and also starred in the short-lived series All Souls (2001), as well as playing Bruce Willis's wife in the film Hostage (2005). She appeared on the television shows Nip/Tuck and NCIS and starred in the film Brothel (2008). She played the role of Carole Middleton, mother of Kate Middleton, in William & Kate: The Movie, a biopic of Kate's romance with Prince William.

Filmography

Film
{| class="wikitable sortable"
|-
! Year
! Title
! Role
! Notes
|-
|1991 || Let Him Have It || Stella ||
|-
|1993 || Diana: Her True Story || Diana, Princess of Wales ||
|-
|1993 || Harnessing Peacocks || Hebe ||
|-
|1994 || Bermuda Grace || Kathy Madeira ||
|-
|1994 || Sherwood's Travels || Marian Sherwood || 
|-
|1995 || The Way to Dusty Death || Alexis Dunetskaya ||
|-
|1998 || Relax...It's Just Sex || Megan Pillsbury ||
|-
|1999 || The World Is Not Enough || Dr. Molly Warmflash ||
|-
|2000 || Skeleton Woman || Anna ||
|-
|2002 || Code Hunter || Dr. Valerie Harman ||
|-
|2004 || Haven || Mrs. Allen ||
|-
|2005 ||  Hostage || Jane Talley ||
|-
|2006 || The Thirst || Mariel ||
|-
|2008 || Brothel || Julianne ||
|-
|2011 || William & Kate: The Movie || Carole Middleton ||
|-
|2014 || Inherent Vice || Sloane Wolfmann ||
|-
|2019
|Fat: A Documentary|Producer
|
|-
|2020 || Rolling Thunder || Iris ||
|-
|2021
|Fat: A Documentary 2|Producer
|
|-
|2022
|Beyond Impossible|Producer
|
|}

Television
 Nash Bridges as Kelly Bridges (1996, 1997)
 Nostromo (1996)
 Buffy the Vampire Slayer (1998)
 All Souls (2001)
 The Agency (2002)
 The Division (2003)
 She Spies (2003)
 Over There (2005)
 Freddie (2006)
 Wicked Wicked Games (2006–07)
 NCIS (2007)
 Nip/Tuck (2007)
 Rizzoli & Isles (2016)
 Scorpion'' (2017)

References

External links
Serena Scott Thomas at Twitter

Serena Scott Thomas – Actress (Bond Girl). Fascination Street Podcast, 25. February 2018

1961 births
English film actresses
English television actresses
Living people
People from West Dorset District
20th-century English actresses
21st-century English actresses
Actresses from Dorset
People educated at Leweston School